The 2016 United States presidential election in Maryland was held on Tuesday, November 8, 2016, as part of the 2016 United States presidential election in which all 50 states plus the District of Columbia participated. Maryland voters chose electors to represent them in the Electoral College via a popular vote, pitting the Republican Party's nominee, businessman Donald Trump, and running mate Indiana Governor Mike Pence against Democratic Party nominee, former Secretary of State Hillary Clinton, and her running mate Virginia Senator Tim Kaine. Maryland has 10 electoral votes in the Electoral College.

Clinton won Maryland with 60.3% of the vote, while Trump received 33.9%. Maryland was among the eleven states in which Clinton improved on Barack Obama's 2012 raw vote total, although by just 84 votes. Maryland was one of four states in which Clinton received over 60% of the vote, the others being Massachusetts, Hawaii, and California; out of the four, however, Maryland was the only one to have voted more Democratic in both 2012 and 2016.

Clinton continued the tradition of Democratic dominance in the state of Maryland, capturing large majorities of the vote in the densely populated and heavily nonwhite Democratic Baltimore–Washington metropolitan area, while Trump easily outperformed her in more white, sparsely populated regions elsewhere in the state that tend to vote Republican. While Republicans typically win more counties, they are usually swamped by the heavily Democratic counties between Baltimore and Washington. Though Trump won 17 of Maryland’s 24 county-level jurisdictions, the state's four largest county-level jurisdictions—Montgomery, Prince George's and Baltimore counties and the City of Baltimore—all broke for Clinton by double digits, enough to deliver the state to her.

Clinton became the first Democrat to win Anne Arundel County, home to the state capital of Annapolis, since Lyndon B. Johnson in 1964. Therefore, Trump became the first Republican to win the White House without carrying Anne Arundel County since Calvin Coolidge in 1924.

Primary elections

The incumbent President of the United States, Barack Obama, a Democrat and former U.S. Senator from Illinois, was first elected president in the 2008 election, running with former Senator Joe Biden of Delaware. Defeating the Republican nominee, Senator John McCain of Arizona, with 52.9% of the popular vote and 68% of the electoral vote, Obama succeeded two-term Republican President George W. Bush, the former Governor of Texas. Obama and Biden were reelected in the 2012 presidential election, defeating former Massachusetts Governor Mitt Romney with 51.1% of the popular vote and 61.7% of electoral votes. Although Barack Obama's approval rating in the RealClearPolitics poll tracking average remained between 40 and 50% for most of his second term, it has experienced a surge in early 2016 and reached its highest point since 2012 during June of that year. Analyst Nate Cohn has noted that a strong approval rating for Barack Obama would equate to a strong performance for the Democratic candidate, and vice versa.

Following his second term, President Barack Obama was not eligible for another reelection. In October 2015, Obama's running-mate and two-term Vice President Joe Biden decided not to enter the race for the Democratic presidential nomination either. With their terms expiring on January 20, 2017, the electorate was asked to elect a new president, the 45th president and 48th vice president of the United States, respectively.

Democratic primary

Republican primary

Minor parties

Green primary

Libertarian convention

Polling

Results

Results by county

Counties that flipped from Democratic to Republican
Somerset (largest town: Princess Anne)

Counties that flipped from Republican to Democratic
Anne Arundel (largest community: Glen Burnie)

By congressional district
Clinton won 7 of the state's 8 congressional districts.

See also
 United States presidential elections in Maryland
 2016 Democratic Party presidential debates and forums
 2016 Democratic Party presidential primaries
 2016 Republican Party presidential debates and forums
 2016 Republican Party presidential primaries

References

External links
 RNC 2016 Republican Nominating Process 
 Green papers for 2016 primaries, caucuses, and conventions

Maryland
2016
Presidential